At least four ships of the Royal Navy have borne the name Nereide, after the Nereid (sea nymph):

She was recaptured by the French in 1810 during the Battle of Grand Port and broken up after being badly damaged.
She was broken up in 1816.
  was an  launched in 1910 and scrapped in 1920. 
  was a  sloop launched in 1944 and scrapped in 1958.

Royal Navy ship names